A status referendum was held on the island of Bonaire on 21 October 1994.  Voters were asked to choose between the status quo, autonomy within the Netherlands, integration with the Netherlands or independence.  The vast majority voted for the status quo, but in a referendum in 2004 finally decided on integration into the Netherlands.

Results

See also
Dissolution of the Netherlands Antilles

References

Referendums in Bonaire
Referendums in the Netherlands Antilles
1994 in Bonaire
1994 referendums
Bonaire 
October 1994 events in North America